The McLellan Galleries are a major exhibition space in the city of Glasgow, Scotland, situated behind a frontage of shops and offices in Sauchiehall Street.

History

As part of the city's expansion on Blythswood Hill spearheaded by William Harley, the Galleries were built in 1855-6 to a design by architect James Smith of Blythswood Square at a cost of £40,000 .They are named after their founder, Archibald McLellan (1795–1854), a coach builder, councillor and patron of the arts. Following his death, Glasgow Corporation acquired the galleries and collection, and for a time they were known as the Corporation Halls before reverting to their former owner's name. The Galleries housed Glasgow School of Art from 1869 to 1899.

In October 1986, the shop frontage building housing the Galleries was ravaged by fire, but they re-opened in 1990 as the largest quality, climate-controlled, temporary exhibition gallery in Scotland. They continue to be the largest exhibition space in the city-centre.

While Kelvingrove Art Gallery and Museum was closed for refurbishment between 2003 and 2006, the McLellan Galleries hosted a display of its best-loved works.

The McLellan Galleries were then leased to the Glasgow School of Art as studio and storage space in preparation for the planned redevelopment of the Glasgow School of Art campus.

Since 2012 there has been public discussion involving user organisations such as the Royal Glasgow Institute of the Fine Arts with a view to re-establishing the McLellan Galleries as a major feature in Glasgow’s cultural life.

The galleries have been protected as a category B listed building since 1970.

References

External links
 Glasgow Museums' website on the McLellan
 Glasgow City Council's page on the McLellan Galleries

Cultural infrastructure completed in 1856
Art museums and galleries in Glasgow
Glasgow School of Art
Category B listed buildings in Glasgow
Art galleries established in 1856
1856 establishments in Scotland